Since Arkansas became a U.S. state in 1836, it has sent  congressional delegations to the United States Senate and United States House of Representatives. Each state elects two senators to serve for six years, and members of the House to two-year terms. Before becoming a state, the Arkansas Territory elected a non-voting delegate at-large to Congress from 1819 to 1836.

These are tables of congressional delegations from Arkansas to the United States Senate and the United States House of Representatives.

Current delegation 

Arkansas's current congressional delegation in the  consists of its two senators, and four representatives, all of whom are Republicans.

The current dean of the Arkansas delegation is Senator John Boozman, having served in the U.S. Congress since 2001.

United States Senate

United States House of Representatives

1819–1836: 1 non-voting delegate 
The Arkansas Territory was created on July 4, 1819, and it sent a non-voting delegate to the House.

1836–1853: 1 seat 
Following statehood on June 15, 1836, Arkansas had one seat in the House.

1853–1863: 2 seats 
Following the 1850 census, Arkansas was apportioned two seats.

1863–1873: 3 seats 
Following the 1860 census, Arkansas was apportioned three seats.

1873–1883: 4 seats 
Following the 1870 census, Arkansas was apportioned four seats.

1883–1893: 5 seats 
Following the 1880 census, Arkansas was apportioned five seats.

1893–1903: 6 seats 
Following the 1890 census, Arkansas was apportioned six seats.

1903–1953: 7 seats 
Following the 1900 census, Arkansas was apportioned seven seats.

1953–1963: 6 seats 
Following the 1950 census, Arkansas was apportioned six seats.

1963–present: 4 seats 
Since the 1960 census, Arkansas has been apportioned four seats.

Key

See also

List of United States congressional districts
Arkansas's congressional districts
Political party strength in Arkansas

Notes

References 

 
 
Arkansas
Politics of Arkansas
Congressional delegations